

Description
Mussismilia is a colonial coral. Budding is always intracalicular, occurring inside the oral disc of the polyp, within the whorl of tentacles. The corallites are phaceloid or subplocoid, with irregular teeth or one to three centres being linked. When coenosteum is present, there is a distinctive double wall. The columella is discontinuous. The septa are porous and have unique, multi-directional teeth formed of twisted threads. The columella is spongy, and the columellar teeth are different in size and shape from the septal teeth.

Evolutionary History

Classification 
Mussismilia is a genus of stony corals in the subfamily Faviinae of the family Mussidae. This genus is restricted to the Atlantic Ocean off the coasts of Brazil.

Hexacorallia 
Hexacorallia belong to the class Anthozoa, comprising organisms that form polyps with 6-fold symmetry, which includes all of the stony and reef-building corals. They have...

Scleractinia

Mussidae 
A family of stony coral restricted to the Atlantic Ocean, they have a massive spheroid form with convolutions that resemble a brain. They are reef-building corals that are popular in captivity, but also the most vulnerable to coral bleaching and climate change

Faviinae  
A family of stony reef-building corals that contain zooxanthellae, gaining energy from their symbionts as well as captured prey such as brine shrimp. They have massive colonies which can be in a phaceloid, plocoid, ceroid, or meandroid (rarely) shaped. They prefer intense sunlight and moderate  water currents, especially since their preferred habitats are reef flats. They can tolerate dynamic environments, such as variations in salinity.

Species
The World Register of Marine Species lists the following three species:

Mussismilia braziliensis (Verrill, 1868)
Colonies are massive, usually forming large domes on reef tops. They have a cerioid colony form with an irregular shape and are around 8-10 mm in diameter. Septa of living colonies have rounded, bead-like dentations. They are usually blue-grey, green and yellow in color, and live in the shallow or subtidal reef environments around Brazil.

A higher abundance of T. hirsutus crabs associated with M. braziliensis has also been observed, possibly due to unique structural composition.

Mussismilia harttii (Verrill, 1868)
Mussismilia hartti has a phaceloid colony form and have calice diameters of 12–30 mm with 12–14 thin septa per cm. It  is observed to have a greater crustacean fauna richness compared to the other species of Mussismilia due to its large meandroid pattern in which polyps are larger and grow apart

Mussismilia hispida (Verrill, 1901)
Mussismilia hispida colonies are massive, less than 0.5 metres across and usually flat. They are round with thick walls, and are around 10-15 mm in diameter. Septa of living colonies have rounded, bead-like teeth. They are brown and grey in color, usually with differently colored walls and centers, and can have radial stripes. They live in shallow water and can tolerate unstable environments.

An additional species has been added into the genus Mussismilia:

 Mussismilia leptophylla 
Originally, this species was placed in the genus Favia because it was thought to lack multiple trabecular fan systems, commonly found in Mussismilia. However, researchers have found that Mussismilia leptophylla contain more than one fan system and it has many features in common with Mussismilia than Favia, including its parathecal wall structure, and the shape of its septal teeth and microstructure. It's mitochondrial structure also groups it more closely with Mussismilia.

Morphology/Anatomy

Macromorphology (overall physical form) 
colony form: phaceloid or subplocoid

calice: Species of Mussismilia differ in colony form and calice size

Septa: thin and often porous near the columella

columella: continuous with trabecular linkage between centres.

corallite wall: parathecal wall

Micromorphology (3D geometry of teeth/septa, etc) 
Septa: regular lacerate (twisted and multidirectional), spine-shaped porous granulation

Columella: spongy, and vary in size and shape from septal teeth

Microstructure (internal structure) 
Wall: Parathecal (which is a Corallite wall formed by dissepiments or divisions in the tissue), along with calcifications in the wall

Septa:

Columella:

Soft Parts

Skeleton

Growth

Ecology

Feeding/Diet

Symbionts and Microbiota 
The most abundant bacterium found in healthy Mussismilia corals include Alphaproteobacteria, Gammaproteobacteria, Cyanobacteria, Bacteroidetes, and Firmicute. Diseased corals were found to have a distinct microbiota, dominated by Bacteroidetes, Gammaproteobacteria, and unclassified Proteobacteria. The most abundant groups in the bare skeleton (SK) were Deltaproteobacteria, Alphaproteobacteria,, and Gammaproteobacteria, with a greater amount of Vibrios and Sulfate-Reducing Bacteria compared to healthy corals.

Reproduction/Life cycle 

Members of the class Anthozoa are either gonochoric or hermaphroditic. Mature gametes are shed into the coelenteron and spawned through the mouth. Then, the zygote develops into a planktonic planula larva, then tentacles, septa and pharynx develop before larval settlement. 

M. hispida is a sequential hermaphroditic species with a broadcast-spawning mode of reproduction

Asexual Reproduction

Sexual Reproduction

Status

Threats

Climate Change Impacts

Bibliography 

 Andrade Galvão de Medeiros, Seoane, J. C. S., Macedo de Mello Baptista, G., Leal, P. R., & Dekker, A. (2022). Effect of temperature and pH on the Millepora alcicornis and Mussismilia harttii corals in light of a spectral reflectance response. International Journal of Remote Sensing, 43(7), 2475–2502. 
 This article is peer reviewed and explains how our climate affects Mussismilia. This topic is very interesting and contributes to a broader discussion about the role that climate change plays in marine biology. It is also useful in establishing notability.
Fernando, Wang, J., Sparling, K., Garcia, G. D., Francini-Filho, R. B., de Moura, R. L., Paranhos, R., Thompson, F. L., & Thompson, J. R. (2015). Microbiota of the Major South Atlantic Reef Building Coral Mussismilia. Microbial Ecology, 69(2), 267–280.
 This article is peer reviewed and explains how Mussismilia is one of the main coral reef builders in the South Atlantic. It will be useful when explaining how Mussismilia contributes to the ecosystems it inhabits. It is also helpful when establishing notability.

 Godoy, Mies, M., Zilberberg, C., Pastrana, Y., Amaral, A., Cruz, N., Pereira, C. M., Garrido, A. G., Paris, A., Santos, L. F. A., & Pires, D. O. (2021). Southwestern Atlantic reef-building corals Mussismilia spp. are able to spawn while fully bleached. Marine Biology, 168(2).
 This peer-reviewed article talks about coral bleaching and how it affects Mussismilia. Bleaching is an event that is occurring at a very high rate, so it is useful and interesting to understand how bleaching affects Mussismilia. Since it covers the topic in depth, it will be useful in establishing notability
 Nogueira, M.M., Neves, E. & Johnsson, R (2015). Effects of habitat structure on the epifaunal community in Mussismilia corals: does coral morphology influence the richness and abundance of associated crustacean fauna?. Helgol Mar Res 69, 221–229
 This is a scientific article published in Helgoland Marine Research, so it should be a reliable source. They compile research from many scientific articles to study how the distinct morphology of three species of Mussismilia influences their association with crustacean species. This article is helpful when discussing specific facts, but can’t be used to establish notability.
 Oigman-Pszczol, & Creed, J. C. (2004). Size Structure and Spatial Distribution of the Corals Mussismilia Hispida And Siderastrea Stellata (Scleractinia) at Armação Dos Búzios, Brazil. Bulletin of Marine Science, 74(2), 433–448.
 This is a peer-reviewed article describing the population size structure and spatial distribution of corals on Brazilian rocky shores. This quantitative study looks at Mussismilia hispida and Siderastrea stellata. It is important to understand the structure and distribution of these corals, and we can compare them to other coral found in the same area. Can be helpful in establishing notability as well.
http://www.coralsoftheworld.org/species_factsheets/species_factsheet_summary/mussismilia-hispida/
https://www.saltyunderground.com/article/34-faviidae-corals
https://link.springer.com/article/10.1007/s00338-002-0217-x
https://www.sealifebase.se/Reproduction/FishReproSummary.php?ID=45786&GenusName=Mussismilia&SpeciesName=harttii&fc=1448&StockCode=63896

References

Faviinae
Scleractinia genera